Dmitri Popov (born 1967) is a Russian footballer.

Dmitri Popov may also refer to:
 Dmitry Ivanovich Popov (1892–1921), revolutionary of Russia
 Dmitry Yakovlevich Popov (1863–1921), Russian priest and revolutionary, a deputy of the Fourth Imperial Duma

See also
 Dmitri Sinodi-Popov (1855–1910), Russian artist